King of Dixie is the fifth full-length studio album by American country rap artist Ryan Upchurch. It was released on October 18, 2017 via Redneck Nation Records. It features guest appearances from JellyRoll and Robert James.

The album debuted at number 65 on the Billboard 200 albums chart in the United States. It also peaked at No. 10 on the Top Country Albums chart and No. 30 on the Top R&B/Hip-Hop Albums chart.

Track listing

Charts

References

External links
King of Dixie by Upchurch on iTunes
Upchurch© King Of Dixie album on Redneck Nation

2017 albums
Upchurch (musician) albums